Closer to the Source is an album by trumpeter Dizzy Gillespie recorded in 1984, featuring an all star cast of guest musicians and released on the Atlantic label.

Critical reception

The Allmusic review stated "This set of commercial material (with guest spots by Stevie Wonder, tenor saxophonist Branford Marsalis and bassist Marcus Miller) is quite forgettable -- throwaway funk tunes with the parts of the sidemen sounding as if they were phoned in".

The album was also Grammy nominated in the category of Best Jazz Instrumental Performance, Soloist.

Track listing
 "Could It Be You" (Marcus Miller) - 5:15 
 "It's Time for Love" (Kenny Gamble, Leon Huff) - 5:01 
 "Closer to the Source" (Leroy Hutson, Lonnie Reaves, Alfonzo Surrett) - 4:58 
 "You're No. 1 in My Book" (Dana Meyers, Wilmer Raglin Jr., Leon F. Silvers, William Zimmerman) - 4:23 
 "Iced Tea" (Vincent Fielder) - 6:21 
 "Just Before Dawn" (Delores Allen, Al Foster) - 4:54 
 "Textures" (Herbie Hancock) - 7:10

Personnel
Dizzy Gillespie - trumpet
Sonny Fortune - alto saxophone
Branford Marsalis - tenor saxophone (track 2)
Barry Eastmond, Kenny Kirkland - keyboards
Hiram Bullock - guitar
Tom Barney  - bass
Marcus Miller - synthesizer, bass
Stevie Wonder - synthesizer, harmonica
Buddy Williams, Tony Cintron Jr. - drums
Angel Rogers - vocals

References 

Atlantic Records albums
Dizzy Gillespie albums
1984 albums